Dalian of Acasia Flowers (in , literally "Dairen of Acasia") is a novel written by a Japanese author, Takayuki Kiyooka.  It is about a youth and his life in Dalian, China, when it was Japan's leased territory. 

Written in 1965, it won Kiyooka an Akutagawa Prize in 1969.  He wrote this story against a Dalian background, when his first wife, whom he had married in Dalian, died. He also wrote many other stories about Dalian.

See also

Akutagawa Prize
Takayuki Kiyooka

References 

1965 Japanese novels
History of Dalian
Novels set in Liaoning